Qal or QAL may refer to:

 Gal, Azerbaijan
 Qal (linguistics), simple form of a Hebrew verb
 Query Abstraction Layer, a Python library
 Queensland Alumina Limited, Australian company
 Queen + Adam Lambert, a musical collaboration